Otonica is a small settlement below the northern slopes of Mount Slivnica in the Municipality of Cerknica in the Inner Carniola region of Slovenia.

References

External links

Otonica on Geopedia

Populated places in the Municipality of Cerknica